Rory Charles Graham (born 29 January 1985), better known as Rag'n'Bone Man, is an English singer and songwriter. He is known for his deep baritone voice. His first hit single, "Human", was released in 2016, and his debut album of the same name was released in 2017. The album became the fastest selling debut album by a male for the decade and has since achieved 4× Platinum certification. At the 2017 Brit Awards, he was named British Breakthrough Act and received the Critics' Choice Award and went on to receive a further BRIT Award for Best British Single, with the title track in 2018.

Following the album's success, Rag'n'Bone Man has performed at headline shows and festivals around the globe and has collaborated with a variety of artists from different genres, including Bugzy Malone (with the track "Run"), Logic (with the song "Broken People" for the soundtrack of Netflix film Bright) and Calvin Harris (with Brit Award nominated and Ivor Novello award-winning single "Giant").

In January 2021, Graham released "All You Ever Wanted", the lead single from his second studio album Life by Misadventure. He then collaborated with Pink for the second single from the album, "Anywhere Away from Here". The album was originally set to be released on 23 April 2021, but was postponed to 7 May 2021.

Life By Misadventure debuted at number one on the UK Albums Chart and spent 7 weeks in the top 10, making it the fastest-selling album by a solo artist in 2021 and gaining Gold certification in the UK.

Graham appeared as Rag’n’Bone Man in an episode of BBC One’s ‘EastEnders’ on 23 December 2022 when he performed a rendition of “God Rest You Merry, Gentlemen” as part of a carol concert in the square in front of cast members.

Early life 
Rory Charles Graham was born on 29 January 1985 in Uckfield, East Sussex. He has a younger half-sister. He attended Ringmer Community College in Ringmer, from which he was expelled, and then enrolled at Uckfield College in his hometown. At the age of 15, he began MCing with a drum and bass crew using the handle Rag 'N' Bonez, inspired by watching repeats of the BBC sitcom Steptoe and Son. While at school, he was part of a group of youths supported by The Prince's Trust who developed a community project which involved painting and gardening in Crowborough.  He still supports the local Brighton and Hove Albion football team.

Career 
When he moved to Brighton, his friend Gi3mo formed the rap group Rum Committee and invited him to join them. He started performing at Slip-jam B, where he met people who helped him start his career. Over the next few years, they supported hip hop artists Pharoahe Monch and KRS-One at Brighton's Concorde 2, and released their own album titled Boozetown (2012) through Bandcamp and other digital stores. Just weeks before the Rum Committee album release, Rory Graham was asked to support Joan Armatrading at Brighton Dome. With no solo releases to his name to distribute on the night, he worked with Rum Committee producers Gi3mo and Sherlock Bones to create his first official release, the eight-track Bluestown EP (2012), which included one feature from the rap artist Ceezlin.

Wolves and Disfigured EPs (2011–2015)
In 2011, Graham started working with UK hip hop label High Focus Records, releasing a number of recordings with them such as  a collaboration with MC/producer Leaf Dog titled Dog 'n Bone EP (2013) and a project with MC/producer Dirty Dike titled Put That Soul on Me (2014). Shortly afterwards, he began to collaborate with record producer Mark Crew, who at the time was working on Bastille's debut album Bad Blood. Graham signed a publishing deal with Warner Chappell in 2013.

In 2014, in collaboration with Mark Crew, Graham released the EP Wolves through Best Laid Plans Records, containing nine tracks with guests including rapper Vince Staples, Stig of the Dump, and Kae Tempest. Graham, along with Skunk Anansie, also featured on Bastille's third mixtape, VS., on the song "Remains". His follow-up in 2015, the Disfigured EP, was also released through Best Laid Plans Records. The lead track "Bitter End" was playlisted on BBC Radio 1 Xtra, and made it onto BBC Radio 1's "In New Music We Trust" playlist.

Human (2016–2020)

Graham's first hit single, "Human", was released on Columbia Records in July 2016. It peaked at number one in the official singles charts in Austria, Belgium, Germany and Switzerland. It was certified Gold in Austria, Belgium, Germany, Italy, the Netherlands, Sweden and Switzerland. "Human" was used as the theme music to the Amazon Prime series Oasis, in the official launch trailer for the video game Mass Effect: Andromeda, in the trailer for the 2017 film Thank You for Your Service, in the television series Inhumans, and in the season 2 intro for the TV show Into the Badlands. The song was also used in the outro for Ash vs. Evil Dead Season 3 Episode 9,the 16th episode of season 7 of the series Suits (season 7) as well as the Tom Clancy's Jack Ryan television series.

Graham's debut album, also titled Human, was released on 10 February 2017. The album opens with the song "Human", features the single "Skin", and has tracks produced by Mark Crew, Two Inch Punch, and Jonny Coffer. The album won the BBC Music Award for British Album of the Year in 2017 and he was nominated for Artist of the Year. Later in 2017, Graham collaborated with British virtual band Gorillaz, appearing on the song "The Apprentice" from the deluxe edition of their fifth studio album Humanz.

Graham also sang and co-wrote one of the songs, "Broken People", from Will Smith's 2017 Netflix film Bright.

In January 2019, Graham collaborated with Scottish DJ and record producer Calvin Harris to record the song "Giant". It peaked at number two on the UK Singles Chart. He also collaborated with the Italian singer Zucchero Fornaciari to write the song "Freedom", for the album D.O.C..

Life by Misadventure (2021)
In January 2021, Graham released "All You Ever Wanted", the lead single from his second studio album Life by Misadventure. He then collaborated with Pink for the second single from the album, "Anywhere Away from Here".  Further singles from the album were "Alone", "Crossfire" and "Fall in Love Again".

The album was originally going to be released on 23 April 2021, but was postponed to 7 May 2021.

Life By Misadventure debuted at number one on the UK Albums Chart and spent 7 weeks in the top 10, making it the fastest-selling album by a solo artist in 2021 and gaining Gold certification in the UK.

Personal life
Graham has a son with ex-wife Beth Rouy. He lives in Heathfield, East Sussex.

Discography

 Human (2017)
 Life By Misadventure (2021)

Accolades

Tours
 Human Tour (2017)
 Life By Misadventure Tour (2021–22)

References

External links

 
 Rag'n'Bone Man at Discogs

1985 births
Living people
Brit Award winners
Columbia Records artists
English baritones
English male singer-songwriters
People from Uckfield
English soul singers
English blues singers
21st-century English singers
21st-century British male singers